The 1922 United States Senate election in Washington was held on November 7, 1922. Incumbent Republican Miles Poindexter ran for a third term in office, but was defeated by Democrat Clarence C. Dill in a three-way race that also featured Farmer-Labor nominee James Duncan.

Republican primary

Candidates
Frances Cleveland Axtell, former State Representative from Bellingham
Austin E. Griffiths, former Seattle City Councilman (1910–13) and candidate for Mayor in 1916
George B. Lamping, State Senator and candidate for Governor in 1920
Miles Poindexter, incumbent U.S. Senator since 1911
George H. Stevenson
Lee Tittle

Results

Democratic primary

Candidates 
Clarence C. Dill, U.S. Representative from Spokane
James Cleveland Longstreet
Lyman Seelye

Results

Farmer-Labor primary

Candidates 
James A. Duncan, candidate for U.S. Representative and Mayor of Seattle in 1920

Results 
Duncan was unopposed for the Farmer-Labor nomination.

General election

Results

See also 
 1922 United States Senate elections

References

1922
Washington
United States Senate